Saint John of the Mountain  Festival is a festival in the town of Miranda de Ebro in the autonomous community of Castile and León, in Spain. It is celebrated on the Monday of Pentecost and it is the second most important romeria in Spain behind El Rocío.

It is an ancestral party whose first documentary references date from the 14th century.

External links
Official web of the festival 

Miranda de Ebro
Festivals in Spain
Castilian culture
Summer festivals